This list of electoral wards in Pembrokeshire includes council wards, which elect councillors to Pembrokeshire County Council and community wards, which elect councillors to community councils.

The county is divided into 59 electoral divisions, all except one returning one councillor. Some of these divisions are coterminous with communities (civil parishes) of the same name. Most communities have their own elected council (indicated by '*'). There are ten town councils and 52 community councils in the county.

Current wards
Since the 2022 local elections the county has been divided into 59 electoral divisions, electing 60 councillors. The following table lists ward divisions and associated communities (including community councillors):

2021 boundary review
A number of ward boundary changes were made following a review by the Local Government Boundary Commission for Wales. 29 of the existing wards remained unchanged although there were some changes to ward names. The overall number of wards was reduced from 60 to 59, with one 2-member ward.

Of the remaining wards:
 The existing Llanrhian ward consisting of the communities of Llanrhian and Mathry together with the community of Pencaer (previously in the Scleddau ward) were combined to create a new electoral ward named Llanrhian.
 The communities of Cwm Gwaun and Puncheston (previously in the Dinas Cross ward) and the community of Scleddau (previously in the Scleddau ward) were combined to create a new electoral ward named Bro Gwaun.
 The existing Newport ward was combined with the community of Dinas Cross to create a new electoral ward named Newport and Dinas.
(The above changes result in a net loss of one seat in this part of the county)

 The communities of Cilgerran and Eglwyswrw were combined to create a new electoral ward named Cilgerran
 The existing Clydau ward consisting of the communities of Boncath and Clydau with the community of Manordeifi (previously in the Cilgerran ward) were combined to create a new electoral ward named Boncath and Clydau.
 The communities of Crymych and Mynachlog-ddu (previously in the Maenclochog ward) were combined to create a new ward named Crymych and Mynachlog-ddu.
 The existing Maenclochog ward was replaced by a new ward of the same name comprising the communities of Clunderwen, Llandissilio West and Maenclochog but the communities of Mynachlog-ddu and New Moat were moved to other wards.
 The existing Wiston ward was replaced by a new ward of the same name. It continued to include the communities of Ambleston and Wiston and the community of New Moat was added. The community of Spittal was moved to another ward.
 The existing Rudbaxton ward was combined with the community of Spittal (previously in the Wiston ward) to create a new electoral ward named Rudbaxton and Spittal.
(The number of seats in this part of the county remained unchanged)

 The existing Camrose ward was replaced with a new ward of the same ward comprising only the community of Camrose.
 The existing The Havens ward was replaced by a ward of the same name including the communities of Nolton and Roch (previously in the Camrose ward) and The Havens.
 The existing St Ishmaels ward consisting of the communities of Dale, Herbrandston, Marloes and St Brides and St Ishmaels, together with the communities of Tiers Cross and Walwyn's Castle were combined to create a new electoral ward named St Ishmaels.
 The existing Johnston ward was replaced with a new ward of the same ward comprising only the community of Johnston.
(The number of seats in this part of the county remained unchanged)

 In Milford Haven, a number of limited changes were made to ward boundaries, but the five wards continued to elect one councillor each.

 The existing Pembroke Dock Pennar ward was divided to create two new wards, named Pembroke Dock: Pennar and Pembroke Dock: Bufferland.
 The boundaries of the existing Pembroke Dock Central and Pembroke Dock Llanion were amended to create two new wards, named Pembroke Dock: Bush and Pembroke Dock: Central
 The existing Pembroke Monkton and Pembroke St Mary South wards together with part of the Pembroke St Michael ward were merged to create a new two member ward named Pembroke: Monkton and St Mary South.
 The existing Pembroke St Michael ward was replaced with a new ward of the same name, but with part of the ward transferred to Pembroke: Monkton and St Mary South.
(There was an increase of one in the number of seats in this part of the county)

 The existing Manorbier ward, minus a part of the community of St Florence, was combined with the community of Penally to create a new electoral ward named Manorbier and Penally.
 The communities of St Florence and St Mary Out Liberty were combined to create a new electoral ward named St Florence and St Mary Out Liberty.
 The existing Amroth ward was combined with the northern part of the Saundersfoot ward to create a new electoral ward named Amroth and Saundersfoot North.
 The remainder of the Saundersfoot ward would form a new electoral ward named Saundersfoot South.
 The existing Carew ward was combined with the community of Jeffreyston (previously in East Williamston ward) to create a new electoral ward named Carew and Jeffreyston.
 The existing East Williamston ward was replaced by a ward of the same name minus the community of Jeffreyston.

Pre-2022 wards
Prior to the 2022 local elections the county was divided into 60 electoral divisions, each returning one councillor. The following table lists council divisions and associated communities:

* = Communities which elect a community council
c = Ward coterminous with community of the same name
u11 = Uzmaston and Boulston community included in Rudbaxton ward prior to 2011. Uzmaston and Boulston combined with Slebech community in 2011 and joined Martletwy ward

See also
 List of places in Pembrokeshire (categorised)

References

Pembrokeshire